Tumubweine Twinemanzi, is a Ugandan economist and central banker who, effective 7 February 2018, serves as the Executive Director of the Bank Supervision Directorate of the Bank of Uganda, the country's central bank and national banking regulator.

Prior to his appointment to his current position, he served as the Director of Industry Affairs and Content (Economic Affairs) at the Uganda Communications Commission (UCC).

Background and education
Twinemanzi was born in Kabale District, Uganda, into an affluent family. His father, Ephraim Manzi Tumubweine, was a former Member of Parliament for Rukiga County (present-day Rukiga District). Manzi also served as Uganda's State Minister of Privatization. Twinemanzi's mother, Christine Nyarubona, hails from the Bunyoro sub-region.

Twinemanzi, obtained a Doctor of Philosophy degree in Economics from the University of Texas at Dallas, awarded in 2009. He also holds other academic qualifications from the University of Florida at Gainesville and from the Barcelona Graduate School of Economics, in Spain.

Work experience
At the time of his appointment to head the bank supervision directorate at the Bank of Uganda, Dr Twinemanzi had over 15 years of experience in middle and senior management. He was replaced at UCC by Julianne Mweheire.

In his new position at Bank of Uganda, he has participated in the parliamentary inquiry into the closure of seven Ugandan commercial banks between 1993 and 2017.

Other considerations
Twinemanzi plays golf and serves as the chairman of Entebbe Golf Club, in the lakeside town of Entebbe.

See also
 Emmanuel Tumusiime-Mutebile
 Louis Kasekende
 Mathias Katamba

References

External links
 Major changes at Uganda central bank linked to Crane Bank collapse As of 10 February 208.
 I cannot reopen closed banks, Mutebile insists As of 16 November 2018.

Living people
Date of birth missing (living people)
Ugandan economists
University of Florida alumni
University of Texas at Dallas alumni
Barcelona Graduate School of Economics alumni
People from Kabale District
Year of birth missing (living people)